Oia or OIA may refer to:

Places 
Oia, Spain, a municipality in Galicia, in the province of Pontevedra
Oia, Greece, a small town on the island of Santorini
Oia, alternate name of Oea (Attica), a town of ancient Attica
Oia, alternate name of Oea (Thera), a town of ancient Thera (Santorini)

Transportation 
Ourilândia do Norte Airport, an airport with IATA identifier OIA
Orlando International Airport ("OIA" is a local abbreviation), which actually uses the letters MCO for its airport designation

Government 
Office of the Independent Adjudicator, the higher-education ombudsman in the United Kingdom
Official Information Act 1982, a piece of New Zealand legislation
Office of Insular Affairs, an office of the United States Department of the Interior
DHS Office of Intelligence and Analysis, an office of the United States Department of Homeland Security
Office of Intelligence and Analysis (Treasury Department), the intelligence organization of the U.S. Department of the Treasury

Other uses 
Oia (spider), a genus of spiders in the family Linyphiidae
Oahu Interscholastic Association, an athletic association of public secondary schools on the island of Oahu, Hawaii
Old Indo-Aryan, the earlier Indo-Aryan languages

See also 
 Oya (disambiguation)